Ambale may refer to:
 Ambale, Chamarajanagar, Karnataka, India
 Ambale, Mawal, Pune district, Maharashtra, India